Khaidi Kannayya is a 1962 Indian Telugu-language crime film directed by B. Vittalacharya and produced by Pothina Doondeswara Rao. It is a remake of the Hindi film Qaidi No. 911 (1959) and its Tamil version Kaithi Kannayiram (1960). The film stars Kanta Rao, Rajanala, Gummadi, Relangi, Rajasulochana and Girija.

Plot 

Kannayya is robbed of the bank cash he was carrying by Paparao, a gangster who also kidnaps his motherless son Ravi with the help of his partner Ramu. Kannayya is framed for the theft and arrested. In prison he learns that his son has died, and blames his sister-in-law Madhavi and her brother Ramu for the death. Kannayya finds solace in the company of Raju, the son of the jailor. Padma is Raju's tutor. A dangerous criminal Durgarayudu kidnaps Raju and absconds from prison. Kannayya escapes to save Raju and finds shelter in Padma's house. Singaram, a small-time thief and lover of Padma, joins him in his pursuit. The area's inspector captures Paparao. Kannayya eventually locates Durgarayudu's hideout with the help of Padma, who wanders the streets singing the song she earlier taught Raju. The guilty is caught, Raju is saved, Kannayya is exonerated and marries Madhavi.

Cast 

 Kanta Rao as Kannayya
 Rajanala as Durgarayudu
 Gummadi as the jailor
 Relangi as Singaram
 Rajasulochana as Padma
 Girija as Madhavi
 Baby Savithri as Raju
 K. V. S. Sarma as Paparao
 Baby Suma as Ravi
 Balakrishna as Ramu
 K. S. Reddy as the inspector

Production 
Khaidi Kannayya is a remake of the Hindi film Qaidi No. 911 (1959), written by C. J. Pavri. It was produced by Pothina Doondeswara Rao, presented by Sundarlal Nahata under Rajalakshmi Productions, and directed by B. Vittalacharya. The film, however, more closely followed Qaidi No. 911s Tamil version Kaithi Kannayiram (1960), except for the climax, which was re-written the way Vittalacharya pleased. Chandru and Govindaswamy were hired as cinematographer and editor respectively, while G. Krishnamurthy wrote the dialogues and lyrics. Rajasulochana and Daisy Irani, who appeared in Kaithi Kannayiram, reprised their roles in Khaidi Kannayya, with Irani again being billed in the credits as "Baby Savithri". The climax was shot at Hogenakkal, Tamil Nadu.

Soundtrack 
The soundtrack was composed by Rajan–Nagendra. The song "Teeya Teeyani Tenela Maatalato", sung by P. Susheela, is based on "Meethi Meethi Baton Se" from the Hindi original, and "Ee Nijam Telusuko", sung by P. B. Sreenivas and S. Janaki, is based on "Ek Sawal My Karun" from Sasural (1961). Two other songs were "Andaala Kalla Choodu" by Susheela, and "Premaku Kaanuka Kaavalena", sung by her and Madhavapeddi Satyam.

Release and reception 
Khaidi Kannayya was released on 1 March 1962. The film became a box office success, running for over 100 days in theatres.

References

External links 
 

1962 crime films
1962 films
1960s Telugu-language films
Films scored by Rajan–Nagendra
Indian crime films
Telugu remakes of Hindi films